Casola Valsenio is a comune (municipality) in the Province of Ravenna in the Italian region Emilia-Romagna, located about  southeast of Bologna and about  southwest of Ravenna.

History
The village was founded in 1216 after the destruction of the Casola castle by the troops of Faenza. Later it was a possession of the Pagani, Visconti, Manfredi, Riario families and of Cesare Borgia.

Main sights
Vena del Gesso Romagnola ("Romagna's Chalk Seam"), a rocky dorsal which cuts transversally the valley coming down from the Apennine Mountains.
Villa il Cardello: an old guesthouse of the Abbey of Valsenio (dating back to the 12th century) as well as the residence of the famous poet and writer Alfredo Oriani where he died on October 18, 1909. Today, the house - national monument - is used as a writer's house-museum; the building is owned by the Fondazione Casa di Oriani.
Watch Tower
Chiesa di Sopra ("Upper Church")
Monte Battaglia, a mountain topped by a medieval tower
Abbey of Valsenio

References

External links
 Official website

Cities and towns in Emilia-Romagna